The Kotmale River  is the longest tributary of Mahaweli River. The river begins as the Agra Oya, in the Horton Plains. The Central Plains have an annual rainfall of between 125 and 200 inches a year. The river flows through a traditional area of ancient villages and tea plantations. King Dutugemunu spent his youth here. The Kotmale Oya flows into the Mahaweli shortly at Pallegama. Tributaries of the Kotmale Oya include the Nanu Oya, the Pundalu Oya, the Puna Oya, and the Dambagastalawa Oya. 

The river was dammed between 1979 and 1985 as part of a hydro-electric project within the Accelerated Mahaweli Ganga scheme. The opening ceremony took place in August 1985. Some 3,000 families had to be relocated to higher ground. The area has a history of geological instability.

See also 
 List of rivers of Sri Lanka
 St. Clairs Falls
 Devon Falls
 Kotmale Dam
 Upper Kotmale Dam

References 

Rivers of Sri Lanka